Morocco competed at the 2019 World Aquatics Championships in Gwangju, South Korea from 12 to 28 July.

Open water swimming

Morocco qualified one male open water swimmer.

Swimming

Moroccan swimmers have achieved qualifying standards in the following events (up to a maximum of 2 swimmers in each event at the A-standard entry time, and 1 at the B-standard)

Men

Women

References

World Aquatics Championships
2019
Nations at the 2019 World Aquatics Championships